Fogelbo House is a log house located in Portland, Oregon. It was listed on the National Register of Historic Places in July 2020.

History 

The log house was built in 1938 by father-son duo Henry Steiner and John Steiner. Later in 1952, the house was purchased by the Fogelquists. In 1978, Washington County designated Fogelbo as a historical site. 

Steiner senior was known for various log houses built in and around Mount Hood area. One of the famous ones is Timberline Lodge, which is also registered with NRHP since 1973.

References

National Register of Historic Places in Washington County, Oregon

Houses in Washington County, Oregon

Houses on the National Register of Historic Places in Oregon
1938 establishments in Oregon
Houses completed in 1938